The Fitzroy River, a perennial river of the Glenelg Hopkins catchment, is located in the Western District of Victoria, Australia.

Course and features
The Fitzroy River rises below Mount Vandyke in the Cobboboonee National Park, near the western edge of the Lower Glenelg National Park. The river flows east by south, through ,
then between the western edge of the Tyrendarra lava flow and the Mount Clay escarpment, and thence across a coastal plain. The river descends  over its  course.

The river is traversed by the Henty Highway at Heywood and the Princes Highway at Tyrendarra.

Etymology
The river was named Clark's River in December 1834 by Edward Henty after the first person in his party to sight it near Tyrendarra. In August 1836 Major Mitchell, who, at the time, was unaware of the presence of the Hentys at Portland Bay named it after FitzRoy Somerset, 1st Baron Raglan when he crossed it near the site of Heywood. Darlots (later Darlot) Creek was named after Henry Darlot who rested cattle beside the creek in 1840 and 1841 prior to the establishment of pastoral leases in the area.

See also

References 

Glenelg Hopkins catchment
Rivers of Barwon South West (region)
Western District (Victoria)